Happy Families Too... is the fifth studio album by English band Blancmange. A re-recording of the band's 1982 debut album Happy Families, the album was originally made available at Blancmange concerts in November 2013, before receiving a wider release via Cherry Red in April 2014.

Background
In November 2013, Blancmange embarked on a UK tour to perform the Happy Families album in its entirety for the first time live. To coincide with the tour, the band re-recorded the album and made it available to purchase at venues during the tour. While the album involved original band member Stephen Luscombe, he did not join the band on tour due to health reasons. The album's wider release in 2014 featured an additional five tracks, including four remixes and a re-recording of the 1982 B-side "Running Thin".

In 2013, Arthur said in a press release for the album: "I wanted to approach the songs using today's technology. Rather than just dust off the old songs, I wanted to bring something fresh to the project and make it a contemporary reworking rather than an exact imitation."

Critical reception

Upon release, David Jeffries of AllMusic considered the album to be "delivered with a modern boom for the bass along with some other minor touches that hardcore fans will enjoy". He concluded: "Happy Families Too is unnecessary, admirable, or awesome depending on your viewpoint, but that third classification is certain for anyone who adored the original." Paul Scott-Bates of Louder Than War wrote: "Happy Families was the sort of album that had timeless tracks that maybe needed a bit of a dusting down, and with Happy Families Too the boys have succeeded admirably." In Q John Aizlewood said that although the duo had been overlooked in favour of the Pet Shop Boys and Soft Cell, their reputation had improved over time, and "their quiet insistence on boundary pushing leaves them more untouched by time than their peers". Mark Elliott of Record Collector commented: "Purists will enjoy a new take on tracks that nudge them in a fresh direction, while simultaneously exorcising the memory of the sometimes tinny original production."

Track listing

Personnel
Blancmange
 Neil Arthur - lead vocals, keyboards
 Stephen Luscombe - keyboards

Additional musicians
 David Rhodes - guitar
 Pandit Dinesh - percussion (track 5)
 Eleanor Arthur - backing vocals (tracks 1-2)

Production
 Adam Fuest - mixing
 Tim Debney - mastering
 Gary Barnshaw - executive producer

Other
 Michael Brownlow - artwork
 Adam Yeldham, Dan Tyler - design

References

2013 albums
Blancmange (band) albums
Cherry Red Records albums